The Diocese of Đà Lat is a Latin suffragan diocese of Roman Catholic church in the ecclesiastical province of the Metropolitan  of the Archdiocese of Ho Chi Minh City in southern Vietnam, yet depends on the missionary Roman Congregation for the Evangelization of Peoples.
 
Its cathedral episcopal see is Nhà Thờ Chình Toà Thánh Nicola Bari, in the southern city of Da Lat, Lâm Đồng Province, Central Highlands.

Its present Bishop is Dominic Nguyễn Văn Mạnh, since September 16, 2019.

Statistics and extent 
As per 2014, it pastorally served 368,487 Catholics (27.8% of 1,325,000 total) on 9,764 km² in 87 parishes and 16 missions with 259 priests (143 diocesan, 116 religious), 1,413 lay religious (501 brothers, 912 sisters) and 69 seminarians. Many of its faithful belong to ethnic minorities.

History 
 The bishopric was created on November 24, 1960 as Diocese of Đà Lat / Ðàlạt (Tiếng Việt) / 大叻 (正體中文) / Dalaten(sis) (Latin), on territories split off from the then Apostolic Vicariate of Saigon and the then Apostolic Vicariate of Kontum
 On 22 June 1967 it lost territory to establish the Diocese of Ban Mê Thuôt.

Episcopal ordinaries
(all Roman Rite)

Suffragan Bishops of Đà Lat
 Simon Hoà Nguyễn Văn Hiền (24 November 1960 – death 5 September 1973), previously Titular Bishop of Sagalassus (1955.09.20 – 1960.11.24) as Apostolic Vicar of Saigon (Vietnam) (1955.09.20 – 1960.11.24)
 Barthélémy Nguyễn Sơn Lâm, Sulpicians (P.S.S.) (30 January 1975 – 23 March 1994), next Bishop of Thanh Hoá (Vietnam) (1994.03.23 – death 2003.06.09)
 Pierre Nguyễn Văn Nhơn (23 March 1994 – 22 April 2010), also President of Episcopal Conference of Vietnam (2007 – 2013); succeeded as previous Coadjutor Bishop of Đà Lat (1991.10.11 – 1994.03.23); next Coadjutor Archbishop of the Archdiocese of Hanoi, succeeding as Metropolitan Archbishop of Hà Nôi (2010.05.13 – ...), created Cardinal-Priest of S. Tommaso Apostolo (2015.02.14 [2015.12.06] – ...)
 Antoine Vũ Huy Chương (1 March 2011 – ...); previously Bishop of Hưng Hóa (Vietnam) (2003.08.05 – 2011.03.01) 
 Coadjutor Bishop (2017.04.08 – ...): Bishop-elect Dominic Nguyễn Văn Mạnh, no other prelature .

See also 
 List of Catholic dioceses in Vietnam

References

Sources and external links
 GCatholic with Google satellite photo - data for all sections
 General Information on the diocese

Roman Catholic dioceses in Vietnam
Da Lat
Roman Catholic Ecclesiastical Province of Ho Chi Minh City
Religious organizations established in 1960
Roman Catholic dioceses and prelatures established in the 20th century
1960 establishments in South Vietnam